S5P4418 is a system-on-a-chip (SoC) based on the 32-bit ARMv7-A architecture developed by Samsung Electronics for tablets and cell-phones

Introduction 
S5P4418 uses the ARM Cortex-A9 in a quad core configuration, the latter provides a 50% overall performance boost over the earlier Cortex-A8 core. The SoC memory controller supports a maximum memory bandwidth of 6.4GB/s for heavy traffic operations such as 1080p video encoding and decoding, 3D graphics display and high resolution image signal processing with a Full HD display. The application processor supports dynamic virtual address mapping, which helps software engineers to fully utilize the memory resources with ease.
The S5P4418 features the Mali-400MP graphics processing unit which supports OpenGL ES 1.1 and 2.0. The native dual display, in particular, supports Full HD resolution of a main LCD display and 1080p 60 frame HDTV display throughout HDMI, simultaneously.

Specifications 
 28 nm HKMG process.
 Quad-core ARM Cortex-A9 at 1.4 GHz
 ARM Mali-400MP GPU
 Full-HD Multi Format Video Codec
 Supports MLC/SLC NAND Flash with Hardwired ECC algorithm (4/8/12/16/24/40/60-bit)
 Dual Display up to 2048x1280, TFT-LCD, LVDS, HDMI 1.4a, MIPI-DSI output
 Supports various memory types: x32 LPDDR3 up to 667 MHz (TBD), Low Voltage DDR3 , DDR3 up to 800 MHz
 3 channel ITUR.BT 656 Parallel Video Interface and MIPI-CSI
 Security functions (AES, DES/TDES, SHA-1, MD5 and PRNG) and Secure JTAG

Related products 
 ARTIK530 — ARTIK530 is Samsung IoT module optimized for IoT gateway or devices with modest video and processing requirements.
 MINI4418 — MINI4418 module is the Computer-on-Module that Boardcon designed for embedded solutions.
 EM4418 — A single board computer features Samsung S5P4418 processor with 1GB RAM and 4GB eMMC Flash.

System on a chip